Nitramide is a chemical compound with the molecular formula . Organyl derivatives of nitramide,  are termed nitroamines, and are widely used as explosives: examples include RDX and HMX. It is an isomer of hyponitrous acid.

Structure 
The nitramide molecule is essentially an amine group bonded to a nitro group. It is reported to be non-planar in the gas phase, but planar in the crystal phase.

Synthesis 
Thiele and Lachman's original synthesis of nitramide involved the hydrolysis of potassium nitrocarbamate:

K2(O2NNCO2) + 2H2SO4 -> O2NNH2 + CO2 + 2KHSO4

Other routes to nitramide include hydrolysis of nitrocarbamic acid,
O2NNHCO2H -> O2NNH2 + CO2

reaction of sodium sulfamate with nitric acid,
Na(SO3NH2) + HNO3 -> O2NNH2 + NaHSO4

and reaction of dinitrogen pentoxide with two equivalents of ammonia.
N2O5 + 2NH3 -> O2NNH2 + NH4NO3

Organic nitramides
Also called nitramines, organic nitramides are important explosives.  They are prepared by nitrolysis of hexamethylenetetramine.

References

Nitroamines